Harry Norton Patterson (February 15, 1853 – May 22, 1919) was an American printer and botanist. 

Patterson was born on February 15, 1853. His father was Edwin H. N. "Sniktau" Patterson, the namesake of Mount Sniktau. He started his career as an apprentice to his grandfather, the publisher of the Oquawka Spectator newspaper. At the age of 19, he published his first botanical paper, which was a catalog of plants collected around his hometown of Oquawka, Illinois. Merritt Lyndon Fernald remarked on the thoroughness of this text. He began to study the flora of Colorado sporadically between 1880 and 1895, with his early trips focused on the Gore Range. 

In 1884, Patterson took control of the Spectator. He often collaborated with botanists such as Michael Schuck Bebb, Cyrus Pringle, Edward Lee Greene, William Marriott Canby, and Asa Gray, and exchanged printed floras with his contemporaries. He also published works by other botanists, including John Donnell Smith's catalog of Guatemalan plants. His wife Florence Beaty also collected botanical specimens.

Legacy
Stylisma pickeringii var. pattersonii, known as Patterson's bindweed, is named for Patterson. Artemesia pattersonii, Astragalus pattersonii, Cryptantha pattersonii, and Machaeranthera pattersonii were named for Patterson by Asa Gray. Poa pattersonii was named for him by George Vasey. 

His personal herbarium is now housed at the Field Museum of Natural History.

Select publications

References

1853 births
1919 deaths
19th-century American botanists
Scientists from Illinois